Association of Colleges and Universities of the Canadian Francophonie (known by the acronym ACUFC for its French name, "Association des collèges et universités de la francophonie canadienne") promotes community college and university education in minority francophone communities in Canada, through cooperation between its member institutions.  In the community it serves, each member institution plays a crucial role in cultural, social and economic development. The association represents its member institutions on topics of mutual interest before the Government of Canada, national and international organizations. Up until 1 April 2015, the organisation was known as the Association of Universities of the Canadian Francophonie, or in French, Association des universités de la francophonie canadienne (AUFC), when it did not include community college members.

Members

The association is made up of the following 22 institutions which promote community college and university education within minority francophone communities in Canada:

 The Office of Francophone and Francophile Affairs of Simon Fraser University in Burnaby, British Columbia
 Collège Éducacentre based in Vancouver, British Columbia
 Campus Saint-Jean of the University of Alberta in Edmonton, Alberta
 La Cité universitaire francophone of the University of Regina in Regina, Saskatchewan
 Collège Mathieu in Gravelbourg, Saskatchewan
 Université de Saint-Boniface in Winnipeg, Manitoba
 Université de Hearst in Hearst, Ontario
 Laurentian University in Sudbury, Ontario
 University of Sudbury in Sudbury, Ontario
 Collège Boréal based in Sudbury, Ontario
 Glendon College of York University in Toronto, Ontario
 Université de l'Ontario français in Toronto, Ontario
 Royal Military College of Canada in Kingston, Ontario
 Collège La Cité in Ottawa, Ontario
 University of Ottawa in Ottawa, Ontario
 Saint Paul University in Ottawa, Ontario
 Dominican University College in Ottawa, Ontario
 Collège communautaire du Nouveau-Brunswick based in Bathurst, New Brunswick
 Université de Moncton in Moncton, New Brunswick
 Centre de Formation Médicale du Nouveau-Brunswick in Moncton, New Brunswick
 Collège de l'Île based in Wellington, Prince Edward Island
 Université Sainte-Anne in Pointe de l'Église, Nova Scotia

Most of these institutions were founded by members of the Catholic clergy to serve isolated francophone communities. While some institutions maintain religious missions, others have assumed specialized vocations such as the Royal Military College of Canada. 

While some member institutions only offer study programs in French, others are bilingual (English/French). Some of the institutions are located in small francophone communities while others are located in heavily populated francophone areas.

The Maritime College of Forest Technology and the Collège nordique francophone are not members of the Association.

The office of the association is located at:
260, rue Dalhousie, bureau 400
Ottawa, Ontario K1N 7E4

Canadian Francophonie Scholarships Program
The AUCC has been the executing agency of the Canadian Francophonie Scholarship Program (CFSP) since July 1, 2006. The Government of Canada funds the CFSP program in its entirety. CFSP is a scholarship program which builds institutional capacities by training nationals of 37 developing countries of La Francophonie. The program is administered by the Canadian Partnership Branch of the Canadian International Development Agency (CIDA).

National exchange program 
The AUFC promotes student exchanges for undergraduate, Masters and doctoral students among member institutions.

AUFC Action Plan
AUFC's action plan for 2007–2012 focuses on supporting its research community and the internationalization of member institutions. The AUFC wants to play a connecting role between Official Language Minority Community (OLMC) researchers and the federal funding agencies.

 creation of an advisory committee on research in June 2006, 
 development of a strategy to enhance researchers' ability to obtain funding from research funding agencies (e.g. concerning Francophone minority communities). 
 adoption of a support plan for research on Francophone minority communities on 31 May 2007
 implementation of priority activities of this plan

The action plan also aims to attract more students and increase the diversity of the student body.

AUFC Research 
A 2005 AUFC study evaluated the state of technological infrastructure within Canada's francophone universities and recommended on its future directions.

AUFC Partners 
AUFC partners include the Consortium national de formation en santé (CNFS), French Language Health Services Network of Eastern Ontario, Consortium des universités de la francophonie ontarienne (CUFO), and Agence universitaire de la Francophonie (AUF).

References

External links 
  

College and university associations and consortia in Canada
French-language education in Canada
Scholarships in Canada